see also Al-Fatiha

The Opener is an album by American trombonist Curtis Fuller, recorded in 1957 and released on the Blue Note label as BLP 1567.

Reception

The AllMusic review by Stephen Thomas Erlewine awarded the album 4½ stars and stated: "The Opener is trombonist Curtis Fuller's first album for Blue Note and it is a thoroughly impressive affair."

Track listing
All compositions by Curtis Fuller except as indicated

 "A Lovely Way to Spend an Evening" (Harold Adamson, Jimmy McHugh) - 6:52
 "Hugore" - 6:43
 "Oscalypso" (Oscar Pettiford) - 5:40
 "Here's to My Lady" (Rube Bloom, Johnny Mercer) - 6:43
 "Lizzy's Bounce" - 5:25
 "Soon" (George Gershwin, Ira Gershwin) - 5:33

Personnel 
Curtis Fuller - trombone
Hank Mobley - tenor saxophone (tracks 2, 3, 5 & 6)
Bobby Timmons - piano
Paul Chambers - bass
Art Taylor - drums

References 

1957 albums
Albums produced by Alfred Lion
Albums recorded at Van Gelder Studio
Blue Note Records albums
Curtis Fuller albums